Two ships of the Japanese Navy have been named Nashi:

 , a  launched in 1919 and decommissioned in 1940.
 , a  launched and sunk in 1945. She was salvaged in 1954 and renamed JDS Wakaba finally being struck in 1971.

Imperial Japanese Navy ship names
Japanese Navy ship names